Isaiah J. Trufant (born December 9, 1982) is a former American football cornerback and special teamer. He was signed by the Spokane Shock as an undrafted free agent in 2006. He played college football at Eastern Washington.

Trufant was also a member of the Kansas City Brigade, Arizona Rattlers, Las Vegas Locomotives, Philadelphia Eagles, New York Jets, and Cleveland Browns.

Professional career

Spokane Shock
A mid-season acquisition for the Shock in 2006, who play their home games only 18 miles from his alma mater, Eastern Washington University. In the semi-finals of the af2 playoffs Trufant was named Defensive Player of the Game as the Shock defeated the Arkansas Twisters en route to winning the Arena Cup.

Las Vegas Locomotives
Trufant was an integral part of the Locomotives defense in 2010. Trufant recorded 30 tackles, one sack, four passes defensed and a UFL record four interceptions, one of which was returned for a touchdown. Trufant was named the UFL's Defensive Player of the Year for his efforts.

New York Jets
Trufant was signed to the New York Jets' practice squad on December 8, 2010. Trufant was promoted to the active roster on December 30. Trufant made his NFL debut with the Jets during their final home game of the season on January 2, 2011.

Trufant was waived on January 22, 2011 after the team promoted Martin Tevaseu from the practice squad.

Philadelphia Eagles
On February 1, 2011, the Philadelphia Eagles claimed Trufant off waivers. He was waived on August 30.

Second stint with the Jets
Trufant was re-signed by the Jets on September 1, 2011. He was waived on September 4. He was signed to the practice squad on September 5, but four days later, he was promoted to the active roster. Trufant scored the first NFL touchdown of his career on September 11, 2011 after a blocked punt by Joe McKnight bounced into his hands which he ran 18 yards to score. Trufant was placed on injured reserve on November 13, 2012 after suffering a knee injury against the Seattle Seahawks on November 11.

Cleveland Browns
Trufant signed with the Cleveland Browns on March 12, 2014. He was released by the Browns on October 17, 2014.

Personal life
He is the younger brother of Marcus Trufant who was formerly with the Seattle Seahawks and Jacksonville Jaguars.  He is the older brother of Desmond Trufant, a cornerback drafted by the Atlanta Falcons in 2013.

References

External links
 New York Jets profile

1982 births
Living people
American football defensive backs
Arizona Rattlers players
Eastern Washington Eagles football players
Kansas City Brigade players
Las Vegas Locomotives players
New York Jets players
Philadelphia Eagles players
Cleveland Browns players
Spokane Shock players
Players of American football from Tacoma, Washington
Ed Block Courage Award recipients